Cheerio or Cheerios may refer to:

 Cheerios, a breakfast cereal with a number of variations
 Cheerio (company), a Japanese soft drink company
 Cheerio (drink), a Japanese soft drink
 Cheerio Meredith (1890–1964), American character actress
 Charles K. Field, eponymous host of the radio program Cheerio
 "Cheerio", a 1983 no. 1 Norwegian hit song by The Monroes (Norwegian band)
 "Cheerio", a track from the 1982 album The Broadsword and the Beast by the rock band Jethro Tull
 Cheerios, a cheerleading squad on the television series Glee
 A small version of a saveloy in New Zealand and Queensland, also called a cocktail sausage
 NGC 6337, a planetary nebula sometimes called the Ghostly Cheerio or Cheerio Nebula
A saying for goodbye in the UK

See also
 Cheerios effect, an effect in fluid dynamics